Paul Davis (born July 21, 1984) is an American retired professional basketball player.

Early years
Davis started his career at Reuther Middle School where his number has been retired.

Davis played for Rochester High School, earning Mr. Basketball of Michigan honors in 2002. As a center for the Michigan State Spartans, he finished the 2005 season as the NCAA Tournament's leading rebounder. Davis was ranked as the nation's number three center by Lindy's College Basketball and the nation's number five post man by Athlon Sports.

In his senior season, he averaged 17.5 points, 9.1 rebounds, 1.6 assists, 1 steal and 0.9 blocks, while also shooting 87% from the free-throw line, and was 6–19 from three-point territory. Paul finished his college career with 1,718 points.

On April 2, 2009, Paul appeared on the Bravo show Millionaire Matchmaker.

Professional career

NBA
On June 28, 2006, Davis was selected by the Los Angeles Clippers in the 2006 NBA draft with the 34th pick (4th pick of 2nd round).

After 2007–08 season, he became a restricted free agent. His rights were renounced by the Clippers, but on August 18, 2008, he was re-signed by the Clippers. He was waived by the Clippers in January 2009.

On September 25, 2009, Davis signed with the Washington Wizards. He was waived on November 11, 2009, when the Wizards signed guard Earl Boykins.

European clubs
On April 8, 2010, Davis signed with Xacobeo Blu:Sens, a Spanish ACB team.

In September 2010 he signed with CB Cajasol Sevilla. After two seasons at Seville, in May 2012 he signed a two-year deal with the Russian club BC Khimki, to join them for the EuroLeague competition. In July 2014, he re-signed with Khimki for one more season. On July 11, 2015, he signed another one-year extension with the club.

On June 27, 2016, Davis announced his retirement from professional basketball due to constant injuries.

Career statistics

NBA

Regular season

|-
| style="text-align:left;"| 2006–07
| style="text-align:left;"| L.A. Clippers
| 31 || 0 || 5.8 || .423 || .000 || .700 || 1.4 || .2 || .2 || .2 || 1.6
|-
| style="text-align:left;"| 2007–08
| style="text-align:left;"| L.A. Clippers
| 22 || 1 || 8.8 || .369 || .000 || .600 || 2.1 || .5 || .3 || .3 || 2.5
|-
| style="text-align:left;"| 2008–09
| style="text-align:left;"| L.A. Clippers
| 27 || 1 || 11.9 || .408 || .000 || .794 || 2.5 || .4 || .4 || .1 || 4.0
|-
| style="text-align:left;"| 2009–10
| style="text-align:left;"| Washington
| 2 || 0 || 4.0 || .500 || .000 || .500 || .0 || 1.5 || .0 || .5 || 2.5
|- class="sortbottom"
| style="text-align:left;"| Career
| style="text-align:left;"| 
| 82 || 2 || 8.6 || .402 || .000 || .732 || 1.9 || .4 || .3 || .2 || 2.6

EuroLeague

|-
| style="text-align:left;"| 2012–13
| style="text-align:left;"| Khimki
| 23 || 2 || 19.6 || .605 || 1.000 || .855 || 5.5 || 1.3 || .9 || 1.0 || 13.4 || 16.1
|- class="sortbottom"
| style="text-align:left;"| Career
| style="text-align:left;"|
| 23 || 2 || 19.6 || .605 || 1.000 || .855 || 5.5 || 1.3 || .9 || 1.0 || 13.4 || 16.1

Domestic leagues

References

External links
 Paul Davis Pictures at Clippers Topbuzz
 Euroleague.net profile
 MSU Spartans bio

1984 births
Living people
American expatriate basketball people in Russia
American expatriate basketball people in Spain
American men's basketball players
Basketball players from Michigan
BC Khimki players
Centers (basketball)
Liga ACB players
Los Angeles Clippers draft picks
Los Angeles Clippers players
Maine Red Claws players
McDonald's High School All-Americans
Michigan State Spartans men's basketball players
Obradoiro CAB players
Parade High School All-Americans (boys' basketball)
People from Rochester, Michigan
Power forwards (basketball)
Real Betis Baloncesto players
Washington Wizards players